Hancock's organ is a lateral concealed sensory organ of gastropods, a chemo-sensory sense organ found in some sea snails. This organ is found in most of the shelled opisthobranchs.

A great majority of the bubble shells and sea slugs of the orders Acteonoidea and Cephalaspidea have Hancock’s organs.

References 

Gastropod anatomy